Nikolay Mikhaylovich Volkov (born 19 December 1951) is a Russian politician.

Childhood and education
Volkov was born in 1951 in Krasnoye village, in the Shablykinsky district of the Oryol Region. In 1973, Volkov graduated from a civil engineer institute in Odessa.

Politics
Volkov is the former governor of the Jewish Autonomous Oblast. Volkov is a member of Our Home Is Russia.  Viktor Gozhy is the First vice-chairman of the Jewish Autonomous Oblast and next in the line of succession after Volkov. In 2006, Volkov met with an American consul general, who also met with representatives of the JAO's Jewish community and visited Birobidzhan Synagogue.  The two men discussed the potential for cooperation between U.S. and JAO businessmen.

Relationship with Jewish Community
In 1997, Governor Volkov stated that he wanted, "our Jewish community to have a permanent rabbi and a synagogue."

Concerning the Jewish community of the oblast and the Birobidzhan Synagogue, Volkov has stated that he intends to, "support every valuable initiative maintained by our local Jewish organizations."

In 2004, Volkov received an award for the category 'Regional Leader' during the 'Man of the Year 5764' Ceremony organized by the Federation of Jewish Communities of the CIS. This award served as recognition for, "his initiative in the revival of Jewish life in Birobidzhan and in arranging the Jewish Autonomous Oblast's 70th anniversary celebrations."

See also
List of Jewish Autonomous Oblast Leaders

References

1951 births
Living people
Jewish Autonomous Oblast politicians
People from Oryol Oblast
Governors of the Jewish Autonomous Oblast
United Russia politicians
21st-century Russian politicians
Members of the Federation Council of Russia (after 2000)